Waingmaw (Jinghpaw: Waimaw) is a town in Kachin State. It is directly southeast of Myitkyina. As of 2014 it had a population of 21,969.

References

External links
Satellite map at Maplandia.com

Populated places in Kachin State
Township capitals of Myanmar